The 2016 St. Petersburg Open was a tennis tournament played on indoor hard courts. It was the 21st edition of the St. Petersburg Open, and part of the ATP World Tour 250 Series of the 2016 ATP World Tour. It took place at the Sibur Arena in Saint Petersburg, Russia, from September 19 through 25, 2016.

Singles main-draw entrants

Seeds

 1 Rankings are as of September 12, 2016

Other entrants
The following players received wildcards into the singles main draw:
  Alexander Bublik 
  Karen Khachanov 
  Andrey Rublev

The following player received entry using a protected ranking:
  Janko Tipsarević

The following players received entry from the qualifying draw:
  Radu Albot 
  Daniil Medvedev 
  Alexandre Sidorenko 
  Mischa Zverev

Withdrawals
Before the tournament
  Marcos Baghdatis →replaced by   Evgeny Donskoy
  Pablo Carreño Busta →replaced by  Lukáš Rosol
  Ernests Gulbis →replaced by  Dušan Lajović
  Jiří Veselý →replaced by  Ričardas Berankis

Retirements
  Mikhail Kukushkin

Doubles main-draw entrants

Seeds

 Rankings are as of September 12, 2016

Other entrants
The following pairs received wildcards into the doubles main draw:
  Alexander Bublik /  Evgeny Donskoy
  Mikhail Elgin /  Alexander Kudryavtsev

Finals

Singles

  Alexander Zverev defeated  Stan Wawrinka, 6–2, 3–6, 7–5

Doubles

  Dominic Inglot /  Henri Kontinen defeated  Andre Begemann /  Leander Paes, 4–6, 6–3, [12–10]

External links
Official website

St. Petersburg Open
St Petersburg Open
St Petersburg Open
September 2016 sports events in Russia